Teniorhinus watsoni, Watson's small fox, is a butterfly in the family Hesperiidae. It is found in Guinea, Sierra Leone, Liberia, Ivory Coast, Ghana, Nigeria, Cameroon, Gabon and the Republic of the Congo. The habitat consists of forests. The species is associated with rivers and swamps.

The larvae feed on Cynometra megalophylla.

References

Butterflies described in 1892
Erionotini
Butterflies of Africa